The Twin is a 2022 psychological horror film directed by Taneli Mustonen. The original screenplay is written by Taneli Mustonen and Aleksi Hyvärinen, who also produced the film. The film tells story about a mother, who has to confront the unbearable truth about her surviving twin son. The film is starred by Teresa Palmer and Steven Cree.

Plot
Rachel, her husband Anthony, and their son Elliot have moved to Finland from New York in order to deal with the grief of losing Elliot's twin brother Nathan in a car accident. During an excursion Elliot discovers a wall purported to grant wishes and makes a secret wish. Shortly thereafter he begins talking to an invisible person. Rachel attends a welcome party held by the townspeople where she meets the town doctor and Helen, the latter of whom cryptically references Elliot's wish.

Elliot begins to exhibit increasingly disturbing behaviors, including him claiming that he is Nathan. An attempt by Rachel to get the town doctor to treat Elliot ends with him insisting that she is sick and needs therapy. Desperate for answers Rachel reaches out to Helen, who tells her that the town is part of a satanic cult. Helen further remarks that her dead husband was possessed by an evil entity that showed up in photographs. At home, Rachel takes photographs of Elliot and brings them to the town to get developed. Later she and Elliot hold a séance of sorts that is interrupted by the townspeople and Anthony, who inform her that they want to use Elliot as part of a ritual.

The following day Rachel retrieves the photographs and is terrified when Elliot doesn't show up in any of the pictures. She takes them to Helen, who tells her that this is the demon taunting her. She convinces Rachel to take her to Elliot so she can try to save him, but upon meeting the boy Helen instead tells Rachel that she is sick. The two women are then surrounded by the townspeople. Rachel is sedated and forced to participate in a satanic ritual, after which she is again sedated. When she awakens Rachel is locked in her room, but manages to escape after she hears Elliot call for help.

Anthony chases Rachel into the forest, where he reveals that Elliot does not exist. Rachel was trying to leave Anthony and take Nathan with her when the accident occurred. Out of a sense of grief and anger she created Elliot as a coping mechanism. Eager to avoid leaving Rachel in an asylum, he went along with the delusion and moved her to Finland to start over. "Elliot" then flees, insisting that Anthony is trying to kill him. Rachel follows him to a grain silo, where Anthony again tries to appeal to his wife by "killing" Elliot by submerging him in the grain. This instead results in Rachel accidentally killing Anthony in an attempt to stop him. She then tries digging Elliot out of the grain, only to find nothing.

The film ends with Rachel returning to New York, where it is shown that she is still delusional. Despite visiting Nathan and Anthony's graves, she believes that they, along with Elliot, are still alive.

Cast
 Teresa Palmer as Rachel
 Steven Cree as Anthony
 Barbara Marten as Helen
 Tristan Ruggeri as Elliot and Nathan
 Andres Dvinjaninov as Town Doctor

Production
On March 2, 2021, it was announced that Teresa Palmer will star in a horror film for the Finnish production company Don Films. London-based sales agency Film Constellation handles world sales.

Principal photography began on March 18, 2021 in Finland and Estonia and concluded on April 28, 2021.

Release 
The world premiere of the film was on March 24, 2022 at the Night Visions film festival. In the United States, the film was streamed exclusively on Shudder starting May 6, 2022.

The film has been very successful in Latin America: in Mexico, the film gathered more than 110,000 viewers on its premiere, and in both Argentina and Peru, the film reached the Top 3 lists of the most watched.

Reception 
Critical reception for the film has been mixed.

Notes

References

External links
 

2022 films
English-language Finnish films
Films about twin brothers
Films set in Finland
Films shot in Estonia
Films shot in Finland
Finnish horror films
Psychological horror films
2020s English-language films
2020s psychological horror films
Films directed by Taneli Mustonen
Films scored by Panu Aaltio